Captain Archibald Henry Maule Ramsay (4 May 1894 – 11 March 1955) was a British Army officer who later went into politics as a Scottish Unionist Member of Parliament (MP). From the late 1930s, he developed increasingly strident antisemitic views. In 1940, after his involvement with a suspected spy at the United States embassy, he became the only British MP to be interned under Defence Regulation 18B.

Family and early life
Ramsay was from a Scottish aristocratic family; his grandfather was Sir Henry Ramsay, younger brother of George Ramsay, 12th Earl of Dalhousie. He attended Eton College and the Royal Military College, Sandhurst, joining the Coldstream Guards in 1913. After the outbreak of World War I, he served in France for two years. He received a severe head injury before being invalided out and transferred to the War Office in London. Here he met and married on 30 April 1917 Lady Ninian Crichton-Stuart, née Hon. Ismay Preston, daughter of Viscount Gormanston and widow of Lord Ninian Crichton-Stuart MP, who had been killed on active service in the war. His wife was the mother of three surviving children. The couple later had four sons together; the eldest died on active service in 1943.

As the war was coming to an end, Ramsay served at the British War Mission in Paris. He retired from the Army with the rank of captain in 1920. He spent the 1920s as a company director, near Arbroath, Angus, and became active in the Conservative Party. In the 1931 general election, Ramsay was elected as MP for Peebles and Southern Midlothian. He was not considered a potential candidate for high office; the most senior appointment he obtained was as a Government member of the Potato Marketing Board.

Spanish Civil War
After the Spanish Civil War broke out, Ramsay became a strong supporter of the Nationalists under Francisco Franco, largely arising out of his opposition to the violent anti-clericalism of the Spanish Republicans and their attacks on the Roman Catholic Church. In the early months of the war, he objected in Parliament to what he saw as bias in BBC news reports on Spain; he pointed to links between Spanish Republicans and the Soviet Union.

Late in 1937, Ramsay formed the 'United Christian Front' to combat attacks on Christianity "which emanate from Moscow". Many distinguished peers and churchmen joined, but the organisation was criticised in a letter to The Times by senior religious figures, including William Temple (Archbishop of York) and Donald Soper. The objectors said that while they supported Christian unity, they could not support the United Christian Front, as it was mainly concerned with the Spanish Civil War and "adopts a view of it which seems to us ill-founded".

Ramsay became aware of a plan to hold a conference of freethinkers in London in 1938, which was being organised by the International Federation of Freethinkers. Together with his supporters in Parliament, he denounced this as a "Godless Conference", organised by a Moscow-based organisation. On 28 June 1938, he asked for permission to introduce as a Private Member's Bill the "Aliens Restriction (Blasphemy) Bill" to prohibit conference attendees from entering Britain; he won the vote by 165 to 134, but the bill went no further. Ramsay's opposition to communism led him to look to other countries for examples. On 13 January 1938, he had given a speech to the Arbroath Business Club in which he observed that Adolf Hitler's antipathy to Jews arose from his knowledge "that the real power behind the Third International is a group of revolutionary Jews".

Some time later in 1938, he read The Rulers of Russia by a reactionary Roman Catholic priest from Ireland, Father Denis Fahey, which contended that of 59 members of the Central Committee of the Communist Party of the Soviet Union in 1935, 56 were Jews, and the remaining three were married to Jews. At the same time, Ramsay was becoming ever more sympathetic to Germany; in September, he wrote to The Times to defend the right of the Sudetenland to self-determination.

On 15 November 1938, Ramsay was invited to a luncheon party at the German Embassy in London, where he met British sympathisers with Nazi Germany, including Barry Domvile. In December he introduced another Private Member's Bill called the "Companies Act (1929) Amendment Bill", which would require shares in news agencies and newspapers to be held openly and not through nominees. In his speech promoting the Bill, Ramsay claimed the press was being manipulated and controlled by "international financiers" based in New York City who wanted to "thrust this country into a war". Ramsay was given permission to introduce his Bill by 151 to 104; again it went no further.

Controversy
On 10 January 1939 the Hon. Mrs Ismay Ramsay gave another speech to the Arbroath Business Club, at which she claimed the national press was "largely under Jewish control", that "an international group of Jews ... were behind world revolution in every single country" and that Hitler "must ... have had his reasons for what he did". The speech was reported in the local newspaper and attracted the attention of the rabbi of the Edinburgh Hebrew Congregation, Dr Salis Daiches, who wrote to The Scotsman challenging Mrs Ramsay to produce evidence. Ramsay wrote on her behalf citing Father Fahey's booklet, and the resulting correspondence lasted for nearly a month—including a letter from eleven ministers of the Church of Scotland in the County of Peebles repudiating the views of their MP.

Some members of Ramsay's local Conservative Association in Peebles were not pleased by what they considered negative publicity. However, Ramsay reassured them that he would continue to be a supporter of Neville Chamberlain and the National Government. Ramsay made attempts to make controversial speeches to private meetings rather than in public. On 27 April he spoke to a branch of the (antisemitic) Nordic League in Kilburn, London, attacking Neville Chamberlain for introducing conscription "at the instigation of the Jews" and claiming that the Conservative Party "relies on ... Jew money".

The Right Club

After the controversy over Mrs Ramsay's January speech died down, Ramsay decided to influence others so that they would rid the Conservative Party of its alleged Jewish control. To this end he set up the Right Club in May 1939, noting down those who had joined in a red leather-bound and lockable ledger (the "Red Book"). There were 135 names on the men's list and 100 on a separate ladies' list; the members of the Right Club include a broad spectrum of those known to be antisemitic (including William Joyce and the Member of Parliament John Hamilton Mackie), those who were in some respects "fellow travellers" with antisemitism, and some friends of Ramsay who may have joined without knowing the actual functions of the club. At its early meetings, the 5th Duke of Wellington took the chair.

While Ramsay was attempting to launch the Right Club, he spoke at a meeting of the Nordic League at the Wigmore Hall at which a reporter from the Daily Worker was present and reported Ramsay as saying that they needed to end Jewish control, "and if we don't do it constitutionally, we'll do it with steel" – a statement greeted with wild applause. The popular magazine John Bull picked up on the report and challenged Ramsay to contradict it or explain himself. Ramsay's local constituency newspaper, the Peeblesshire Advertiser, made the same challenge and Ramsay responded by admitting he had made the speech, citing the fact that three halls had refused to host the meeting as evidence of Jewish control.

Outbreak of war
On the second day of the Second World War, 4 September 1939, Ramsay sat in the library of the House of Commons writing a parody of Land of Hope and Glory, beginning: "Land of dope and Jewry". When the Secretary of State for War Leslie Hore-Belisha (a frequent target of antisemitism) was forced out of office, Ramsay distributed in the House of Commons many copies of Truth (a magazine closely connected to Neville Chamberlain) which argued that Hore-Belisha was no loss to the government. He also put down a motion which cited the regretful reactions of many newspapers to Hore-Belisha's sacking as evidence of Jewish control of the press.

Privately, Ramsay had been invited to some of the "Secret Meetings" at which right-wing opponents of the war discussed tactics. However, after they came to be dominated by Sir Oswald Mosley and his supporters, Ramsay withdrew. The Right Club spent the Phoney War period distributing propaganda in the form of leaflets and 'sticky-backs' (adhesive labels containing slogans), with Ramsay later explaining that he wanted "to maintain the atmosphere in which the "Phoney War", as it was called, might be converted into an honourable negotiated peace." In addition to Ramsay's "Land of dope and Jewry"' rhyme, the slogans included "War destroys workers" and "This is a Jews' War". Some of the leaflets asserted "the stark truth is that this war was plotted and engineered by the Jews for world-power and vengeance".

House of Commons
In Parliament, Ramsay attacked the internment procedure of Defence Regulation 18B and opposed the arrest of antisemitic speaker Richard A. V. "Jock" Houston under the Public Order Act 1936. On 20 March 1940, he asked a question about a propaganda radio station set up by Germany which gave its precise wavelength, which was suspected by both his allies and opponents as a subtle way of advertising it. On 9 May he asked for an assurance from the Home Secretary "that he refuses to be stampeded ... by a ramp in our Jew-ridden press?" His increasingly open antisemitism was picked up by Labour members and others and referred to in debate.

Internment
One of the last members to join the Right Club was Tyler Kent, a cypher clerk at the Embassy of the United States in London. Ramsay gave Kent the ledger containing the list of Right Club members for safe-keeping. Kent was stealing top-secret documents from the embassy and had already fallen under suspicion. On 20 May, after the US ambassador had agreed to waive Kent's diplomatic immunity, his flat was raided and he was arrested; the locked Red Book was forced open. Ramsay's involvement with Kent was extremely worrying to the authorities, as Ramsay enjoyed parliamentary privilege; if Kent had given the stolen documents to Ramsay and he had spoken about them in Parliament, it would have been impossible to prevent their publication. The Cabinet decided to extend Defence Regulation 18B to give more power to detain people suspected of disloyalty.

Ramsay was arrested and lodged in Brixton Prison on an order under Regulation 18B on 23 May 1940. He engaged solicitors (Oswald Hickson, Collier & Co.) through whom he attempted to defend his reputation. When Lord Marley said in the House of Lords that Ramsay was Hitler's chosen Gauleiter for Scotland in the event of an invasion, Oswald Hickson, Collier immediately sent off a letter of complaint.

As an 18B detainee, Ramsay's only lawful method of challenging his detention was to appeal to the Advisory Committee under Norman Birkett, but that recommended his continued detention. However, some of Ramsay's colleagues argued that as he was a Member of Parliament his detention was a breach of parliamentary privilege. The detention was referred to the Committee of Privileges, but on 9 October the committee reported that the detention was not a breach of privilege.

Libel trial

The New York Times published an article on "Britain's Fifth Column" in July 1940 which claimed "informed American sources said that he had sent to the German legation in Dublin treasonable information given to him by Tyler Kent". Ramsay sued for libel, resulting in a trial in July 1941. He asserted his loyalty to Britain. However, some of Ramsay's answers did him damage; for example when asked if he wanted Nazism to be defeated, he replied, substituting "Germany" for "Nazism"; "Not only Germany, but also the Judaic menace". In summing-up, the judge said he was convinced Hitler would call Ramsay "friend" and that Ramsay was disloyal in heart and soul to his King, his Government, and the people.

However, The New York Times could not defend its story, having found no evidence that Ramsay had communicated anything to the German legation, and it was found liable. The judge awarded a farthing (¼d) in damages, the customary award for a libel plaintiff who technically won a case, but was adjudged to have brought his trouble on himself. If the defendant in a libel case pays into court beforehand a sum not less than the damages ultimately awarded, he is not liable for costs; as The New York Times had paid £75 into court, Ramsay became liable for both prosecution and defence costs. Another consequence of the trial was that Ramsay's local Unionist Association disowned him and asked another Member of Parliament, David Robertson, to undertake Ramsay's constituency work.

Subsequent political activity
Ramsay continued occasionally to put down written parliamentary questions from jail, sometimes taking up the cases of fellow 18B internees. His eldest son Alec, serving in the Scots Guards, died of pneumonia on active service in South Africa in August 1943. Ramsay was finally released from detention on 26 September 1944, being one of the last few 18B detainees. He immediately returned to Westminster to resume his seat in the Commons, causing at least one member to walk out of the chamber. His only significant action in the remainder of the parliament was a motion calling for the reinstatement of the 1275 Statute of the Jewry passed under King Edward I. He did not defend his seat in the 1945 general election.

In 1952, Ramsay wrote The Nameless War as an autobiography and a plea to justify his actions. Much of the book consisted of an antisemitic conspiracy theory interpreting the English, French, Russian and Spanish Revolutions as part of a Jewish campaign for world domination. It quoted extensively from The Protocols of the Elders of Zion, the authenticity of which Ramsay took for granted, and added assertions including that Calvin had been a Jew whose real name was "Cohen", that Cromwell had been "a paid agent of the Jews" and that the entire English Civil War and the execution of Charles I were staged for the sole purpose of allowing Jews to return to England.

Ramsay attended some far-right political meetings but did not attract attention. He died in 1955.

References

Sources
Nicholson, Peter [writer and director]. Churchill and the Fascist Plot Channel 4 2011 TV documentary detailing how Winston Churchill and MI5 hunted down a group of British fascist aristocrats plotting to bring down the government and forge an alliance with Adolf Hitler. 
The Nameless War by Archibald Maule Ramsay (Britons Publishing Company, London, 1952) – text available online here
Conspirator: The Untold Story of Churchill, Roosevelt and Tyler Kent, Spy by Ray Bearse and Anthony Read (Macmillan, London, 1991)
Patriotism Perverted: Captain Ramsay, the Right Club and British Anti-Semitism 1939–40 by Richard Griffiths (Constable, London, 1998)

External links 

Excerpt from a BBC film by Robert Harris, playable from Adam Curtis' blog entry titled "Wicked Leaks" (dated 17 December 2010, retrieved 25 December 2010)

1894 births
1955 deaths
People educated at Eton College
Coldstream Guards officers
Graduates of the Royal Military College, Sandhurst
Scottish unionists
British Army personnel of World War I
Members of the Parliament of the United Kingdom for Scottish constituencies
People detained under Defence Regulation 18B
Unionist Party (Scotland) MPs
UK MPs 1931–1935
UK MPs 1935–1945
Antisemitism in the United Kingdom
Archibald
Scottish anti-communists
British conspiracy theorists